Wu Meng (born 2 October 2002) is a Chinese freestyle skier. She competed in the 2018 Winter Olympics in the women's halfpipe. She was the youngest competitor in the 2018 Winter Olympics. She competed at the 2022 Winter Olympics.

References

2002 births
Living people
Freestyle skiers at the 2020 Winter Youth Olympics
Freestyle skiers at the 2018 Winter Olympics
Freestyle skiers at the 2022 Winter Olympics
Chinese female freestyle skiers
Olympic freestyle skiers of China
Sportspeople from Jilin City
Skiers from Jilin